Siviwe Sonwabile 'Shakes' Soyizwapi (born 7 December 1992 in Maclear) is a South African rugby union player, who is currently contracted by the South African Rugby Union to play for the South Africa Sevens national team. His usual position is fullback or winger.

Youth rugby

He played for them at the Under-21 Provincial Championship level in 2012 and 2013, finishing the latter competition as the top try scorer.

Professional career

Eastern Province Kings

Three appearances followed in the 2013 Vodacom Cup (scoring one try), as well as five appearances in the 2013 Currie Cup First Division (where he scored three tries) before reverting to the U21 side for the remainder of the season.

Southern Kings

 He was initially named in the  squad for the 2013 Super Rugby season, but was later released to the 2013 Vodacom Cup squad. He made three starts and three substitute appearances during the 2013 season.

In June 2014, he was selected in the starting line-up for the  side to face  during a tour match during a 2014 incoming tour. He played the entire match and scored the first try for the Kings in the 57th minute of the match as the Kings suffered a 12–34 defeat.

Stormers

Shortly before the start of their 2014 Super Rugby season, the  signed Soyizwapi on a loan deal to provide cover for them at wing and full-back, following injuries to Cheslin Kolbe and Jaco Taute. However, he returned to the Kings shortly afterwards.

Sevens

In October 2013, Soyizwapi was called into a South Africa Sevens training squad before the 2013 Dubai Sevens. In November 2015, he joined the South African Sevens team on a two-year contract.

In December 2019, Soyizwapi captained the Blitzboks squad in the World Rugby Sevens Series in Dubai. He led the South African Sevens team to the finals against the All Blacks Sevens, earning his very first gold medal with an emphatic 15-0 win on his birthday on 7 December.

In 2022, He was part of the South African team that won their second Commonwealth Games gold medal in Birmingham.

References

South African rugby union players
Southern Kings players
Eastern Province Elephants players
Living people
1992 births
People from Mthatha
Rugby union fullbacks
Rugby union wings
Rugby sevens players at the 2020 Summer Olympics
Olympic rugby sevens players of South Africa
Rugby sevens players at the 2018 Commonwealth Games
Rugby sevens players at the 2022 Commonwealth Games
Commonwealth Games medallists in rugby sevens
Commonwealth Games gold medallists for South Africa
Medallists at the 2022 Commonwealth Games